The St Kilda Football Club competed in the 2010 Australian Football League (AFL) premiership season. They finished the home and away season in third place. They won through to the 2010 Grand Final after qualifying and preliminary finals wins and drew with Collingwood in the grand final, however they were beaten in the replay to finish runner up for the second consecutive year.

A number of new records were set by the Saints throughout 2010:
 A new membership record, reported by the club to be 40,544 and the first time the membership has been over 40,000. This bettered the previous record membership of 33,522 in 2009.
 The Round 2 win against North Melbourne by 104 points was a new St Kilda winning margin record against North Melbourne.
A new record home and away game crowd for a match between St Kilda and Geelong of 58,208 was established in Round 13 at the Melbourne Cricket Ground, the fourth largest home game crowd in the club's history and only the sixth home and away home game the club has played at the MCG in 114 years. It was also a new record crowd for a St Kilda home game against Geelong.
The Round 16 away game crowd of 81,836 against Collingwood at the Melbourne Cricket Ground was a new record attendance for a home and away game involving St Kilda. It was also a new record crowd for a St Kilda away game against Collingwood.
The Round 17 home crowd of 49,373 against Hawthorn at Docklands was a new home and away game crowd record for a match between St Kilda and Hawthorn.
The Round 19 win against Port Adelaide by 94 points was a new St Kilda winning margin record against Port Adelaide.

2010 players list

2010 Preseason

NAB Cup

St Kilda qualified for the NAB cup Grand Final however were beaten by the Western bulldogs in to finish Runner up.

Regular season

2010 Finals Series

Ladder

References

External links
 http://saints.com.au

St Kilda Football Club seasons
St Kilda Football Club Season, 2010